Ronald Lewis Troxel (April 2, 1951) is a retired professor emeritus and Chair of the Department of Hebrew and Semitic Studies at the University of Wisconsin-Madison.

Life 
From May 27, 1973, Troxel holds a B.A. from Bethel University (Minnesota). On May 28, 1977, Troxel earned a M.Div., from Bethel Theological Seminary, St. Paul, MN. On December 22, 1985, he earned a M.A., University of Wisconsin-Madison. On August 27, 1989, Troxel successfully defended his dissertation, earning a Ph.D. from University of Wisconsin-Madison. The title of his doctoral dissertation was Eschatology in the Septuagint of Isaiah.

In 1991, he began teaching at the University of Wisconsin-Madison as a lecturer. He became an Associate Professor (with tenure) in 2011, and was promoted to full professor in 2014. From January, 2010 through May, 2014 he served as chair of the Department of Hebrew and Semitic Studies. From 2002 until 2007 he served as advisor for the nascent Religious Studies Program. After the program became an established major, he served as its Coordinator of Undergraduate Education from 2008 until 2010. In 2004 he was awarded the Chancellor’s Hilldale Award for Excellence in Teaching and, in 2009, received the Honored Instructor Award, from University Housing and the Chadbourne Residential College, the University of Wisconsin–Madison, and the Honored Instructor Award, from the Panhellenic Association, the University of Wisconsin–Madison. He regularly presented research in sessions of the Society of Biblical Literature, both in the United States annual meetings and European meetings. Upon his retirement in May 2016, he became Professor Emeritus of Hebrew Bible in the Department of Classical and Ancient Near Eastern Studies at University of Wisconsin-Madison.

Works

Thesis

Books 

Troxel, Ronald L. (2008) LXX-Isaiah as Translation and Interpretation: The Strategies of the Translator of the Septuagint of Isaiah. Leiden: E. J. Brill. ISBN 9004153942.

Troxel, Ronald L. (2015). Joel: Scope, Genres, and Meaning. Critical Studies in the Hebrew Bible. Winona Lake, IN: Eisenbrauns, 2015. ISBN 1575063816.
Troxel, Ronald L. (2022) A Commentary on the Old Greek and Peshiṭta of Isaiah 1-25. TCS 13. SBL Press. ISBN 1628372753.

Articles 
Troxel, Ronald L. (1992). "Εσχατος and Eschatology in LXX-Isa." Bulletin of the Inter­national Organization for Septuagint and Cognate Studies 25: 18-27.
Troxel, Ronald L. (1993). "Exegesis and Theology in the LXX: Isaiah v 26-30." Vetus Testamentum 43: 102-11.

Troxel, Ronald L. (2003). "Isaiah 7:14-16 through the Eyes of the Septuagint." Ephemerides Theologicae Lovanienses 79: 1-19.
Troxel, Ronald L. (2005). "What's in a Name?  Contemporization and Toponyms in LXX-Isa." 327-44 in Seeking out the Wisdom of the Ancients (cited above). ISBN 9781575065625.
Troxel, Ronald L. (2010). "The Use of βουλή in LXX-Isaiah." Pages 1-53 in The Old Greek of Isaiah: Issues and Perspectives, edited by Arie van der Kooij and Michael van der Meer.  Leuven: Peeters. ISBN 9042923512.
Troxel, Ronald L. (2013). "The Problem of Time in the Book of Joel." Journal of Biblical Literature 132 (1): 77-95.
Troxel, Ronald L. (2013). "Confirming Coherence in Joel 3 with Cognitive Grammar."  Zeitschrift für die alttestamentiliche Wissenschaft 125: 578-592.
Troxel, Ronald L. (2015). "The Fate of Joel in the Redaction of the Twelve." Currents in Biblical Research 13 (2): 152-174.
Troxel, Ronald L. (2016). "What is the 'Text' in Textual Criticism?" Vetus Testamentum 66 (3): 603-626.
Troxel, Ronald L. (2017). "Writing a Commentary on the Life of the Text." Vetus Testamentum 67 (1): 105-28.
Troxel, Ronald L. (2021). "Textual Criticism and Diachronic Study of the Book of Isaiah." Pages 159-78 in The History of Isaiah: The Making of the Book and its Presentation of the Past. Edited by Todd Hibbard and Jacob Stromberg. Tübingen: Mohr Siebeck. ISBN 3161560973.
Troxel, Ronald L. (FC). "Translating Isaiah." In The Cambridge Companion to Isaiah. Edited by Christopher Hays. Forthcoming.

References 

Living people
1951 births
University of Wisconsin–Madison faculty
University of Wisconsin–Madison alumni